René Guilbaud (8 October 1890 – 18 June 1928) was an early-20th-century French military aviator.

Long-distance flights

Guilbaud was celebrated mainly for long-range flights, by flying boat across Africa in 1926 and 1927, first in a Lioré et Olivier LeO H-190 and then in CAMS 37.

Disappearance

Guilbaud disappeared in the Barents Sea in June 1928, while piloting a Latham 47 flying boat in which Roald Amundsen was travelling to join the search for survivors of the crash of the airship Italia. While debris from his aircraft was subsequently located by late August, no trace has ever been found of the occupants.

Legacy
The mountain Guilbaudtoppen in Sørkapp Land, Spitsbergen (Svalbard), is named after him.

See also

List of people who disappeared mysteriously at sea

Books
 La vie héroïque de René Guilbaud 1890-1928 - Coindreau (Roger), 1958

References

External links 
 Page dedicated to Cdt Guilbaud on the site of the Association of Reserve Officers of the French Navy (in French)

1890 births
1928 deaths
1920s missing person cases
French aviators
Missing aviators
People lost at sea
Recipients of the Medal of Aeronautic Valor
Victims of aviation accidents or incidents in international waters